Mizo People's Conference (Progressive), a political party in the Indian state of Mizoram. MPC(P) was formed on 19 December 2003 as a split from the Mizo People's Conference. The party was led by member of the Mizoram assembly F. Lalthanzuala.

On 16 April 2004 MPC(P) merged with Mizo National Front.

References

Defunct political parties in Mizoram
2003 establishments in Mizoram
Political parties established in 2003
Political parties disestablished in 2004